Sven Hansson (March 16, 1912 – July 14, 1971) was a Swedish cross-country skier who competed in the 1930s. He won a bronze medal in the 4 × 10 km relay at the 1938 FIS Nordic World Ski Championships in Lahti. His best individual finish was fourth in the 18 km event at the 1937 FIS Nordic World Ski Championships.

In 1936, he won Vasaloppet.

Cross-country skiing results
All results are sourced from the International Ski Federation (FIS).

World Championships
1 medal – (1 bronze)

References

External links

Mention of Sven Hansson's birth and death 

Swedish male cross-country skiers
FIS Nordic World Ski Championships medalists in cross-country skiing
1912 births
1971 deaths